This is a list of members of the Victorian Legislative Council from the elections of 31 August – 2 October 1866 to the elections of 16 September – 2 November 1868.

There were six Electoral Provinces and five members elected to each Province.

Note the "Term in Office" refers to that members term(s) in the Council, not necessarily for that Province.

 Fellows resigned in February 1868; replaced by John O'Shanassy, sworn-in March 1868.
 Lowe died 17 January 1867; replaced by Robert Hope, sworn-in April 1867.
 Rolfe was unseated in March 1867; replaced by Thomas Learmonth, sworn-in March 1867.

References

 Re-member (a database of all Victorian MPs since 1851). Parliament of Victoria.

Members of the Parliament of Victoria by term
19th-century Australian politicians